A halfway house is a community-release institution for prisoners

Halfway house may also refer to:

Arts and entertainment

Film
 The Halfway House, a 1944 British film starring Mervyn Johns
 The Halfway House (2004 film), a film starring Mary Woronov

Music
 Halfway House (album), a 2008 album by Joe Budden
 "Halfway House", a song from the 1985 album Rhythm & Romance
 "Halfway House", a song from Volume 1

Literature
 Halfway House (novel), a mystery novel by Ellery Queen

Places

Canada 
 Halfway House Corners, Ontario, small community in Norfolk County, Ontario, Canada

England 
 Halfway House, Shropshire, village in Shropshire, England
 Half-Way House, West Ealing, a coaching inn
 Halfway Houses, Greater Manchester, a location in the United Kingdom
 Halfway Houses, Kent, a village on the Isle of Sheppey in Kent, England

South Africa 
 Halfway House Estate, suburb of Johannesburg, South Africa

United States 
(by state)
 Half Way House (Chatham, Massachusetts)
 Half-Way House (Parkton, Maryland)
 Daniel O'Sullivan House, also known as Halfway House, Flushing, Michigan
 Halfway House (Columbus, Montana)
 Shea Farm Halfway House, a women's prison in New Hampshire
 Halfway House Outlier, an ancestral Puebloan great house and archeological site in New Mexico
 Halfway House, Pennsylvania, town in Pennsylvania
 Greyhound Half-Way House, Waverly, Tennessee
 Halfway House (Ansted, West Virginia)
 Halfway House (King, Wisconsin), listed on the NRHP in Waupaca County, Wisconsin

See also
 Halfway (disambiguation)
 Halfway Home (disambiguation)